This is a list of War of 1812 battles, organized chronologically and by the theater in which they occurred.

Major theaters
The War of 1812 was fought in four major theaters: the Atlantic Coast, the Canada–US border, the Gulf Coast, and the American West. There were also numerous naval battles at sea, almost all of them in the Atlantic. Actions along the Canadian border occurred in three sectors (from west to east): the old Territory, the Niagara Frontier, and the St. Lawrence River.

Battles (chronological order within theater)

1812

American Northwest
 Capture of the Cuyahoga Packet (July 2, 1812): The capture on the Detroit River of the American merchant schooner Cuyahoga Packet by several members of Canadian Provincial Marine in a rowboat commanded by Lieutenant Frédérick Rolette. The American vessel contained official documents with information valuable to the British belonging to Brigadier General William Hull. Hull was unaware that war had been declared when he dispatched the schooner.
 Capture of Michilimackinac Island (July 17, 1812): The bloodless capture of Fort Mackinac on Michilimackinac (Mackinac) Island by a British force consisting of a small number of regulars, about two hundred fur traders and four hundred Chippewa, Menominee, Ottawa, Sioux, and Winnebago warriors. The Americans surrendered without firing a shot.
 Hull's Campaign on the Detroit River (July 12–August 8, 1812): A lackluster attempt by Brigadier General William Hull to invade Upper Canada across the Detroit River. After successfully crossing the river on July 12, the Americans never pressed the attack on the out-numbered British force at Fort Amherstburg, and withdrew back to Detroit when Hull learned of the imminent arrival of British reinforcements under the command of Major General Isaac Brock.
 Skirmish at Brownstown, Michigan Territory (August 5, 1812): A British victory in which a small force, including twenty-five warriors under Tecumseh, ambushed two hundred Ohio militiamen at a small Wyandot village (located near present-day Gibraltar about twenty miles south of Detroit), who were on their way to escort a supply train from Frenchtown (near present-day Monroe) headed for Detroit.
 Skirmish at Maguaga, Michigan Territory (August 9, 1812): The first land battle of the war in which the Americans held their own.  It occurred when an American detachment sent to Maguaga (a Wyandot village near present-day Wyandotte) to reopen the supply line between Frenchtown (present-day Monroe) and Detroit was ambushed by a British force including both regulars and native warriors under Tecumseh.
 Massacre at Fort Dearborn, Illinois Territory (August 15, 1812): A massacre carried out by Potawatomi and Menominee warriors following the evacuation of Fort Dearborn (at the location of present-day Chicago), ordered by Brigadier General Hull upon learning that Fort Mackinac had been captured by the British. The garrison was attempting to march to Fort Wayne, Indiana Territory, when the attack occurred about a mile and a half south of Fort Dearborn.
 Capture of Detroit, Michigan Territory (August 16, 1812): A startling and humiliating defeat for the Americans. Hull surrendered Detroit without a fight, despite having a larger force under his command than the force under Major General Isaac Brock, his British adversary.
 Massacre at Pigeon Roost, Indiana Territory (September 3, 1812): An attack by Kickapoo Warriors on a small settlement about a hundred miles south of present-day Indianapolis, Indiana.
 Investment of Fort Harrison, Indiana Territory (September 3–16, 1812): The first American victory in the war on land.  The fort (located on the Wabash River just north of present-day Terre Haute, Indiana) defended by about sixty officers and men under the command of Captain Zachary Taylor, was attacked by a large party of Kickapoo, Miami, Potawatomi, Shawnee and Winebago warriors from Prophetstown, Indiana Territory.  When a relief part arrived from Vincennes, the Indians withdrew.
 Investment of Fort Wayne, Indiana Territory (September 5–12, 1812): An unsuccessful attempt by about six hundred warriors from the Ottawa Nations to infiltrate and attack the American garrison at Fort Wayne at the confluence of the Maumee, St. Joseph and St. Mary Rivers in northeastern Indiana Territory.
 Harrison's Campaign in the Northwest (September 17, 1812 – October, 1813): A campaign tasked with reestablishing security in the Old Northwest and retaking Detroit following Hull's disastrous performance as commander of the army on the Detroit frontier. Even before taking command of the Northwestern American army, William Henry Harrison (commissioned as a brigadier general in August, 1812, and promoted to major general in March, 1813) had begun the process establishing supply bases in northern Ohio and sending detachments of infantry to protect American forts that were threatened by Indians allied with the British.  He oversaw the construction of Fort Meigs in early 1813, secured his supply line, and reoccupied Detroit following the American naval victory on Lake Erie.
 Destruction of Prophetstown, Indiana Territory (November 19, 1812): An attack ordered by Brigadier General William Henry Harrison on the Indian settlement near the junction of the Tippecanoe and Wabash Rivers north of present-day Lafayette, Indiana, that had been the site of the Battle of Tippecanoe in November, 1811.  The village was not occupied at the time of the attack.
 Battle on the Mississinewa River, Indiana Territory (December 17–18, 1812): A battle that occurred during an expedition against Delaware and Miami villages at a location where the Mississinewa River flows into the Wabash River near present-day Marion, Indiana.

Niagara Frontier

 First British raid at Charlotte, New York, at the mouth of the Genesee River (October 1, 1812): A raid by a British landing party from the Royal George, in which the British seized the American merchantman Lady Murray and a smaller boat, with no resistance from the small American force present.
 Capture of HMS Caledonia (1807) and HMS Detroit (1812) at Ft. Erie, Upper Canada (October 9, 1812): A successful raid conducted by about a hundred American troops who crossed the Niagara River from Buffalo and captured two Provincial Marine brigs that had just arrived at Fort Erie. The Caledonia was sailed safely to Black Rock on the American side of the river, whereas the Detroit ran aground at the southern tip of Squaw Island and was set on fire before the British could recapture it.
 Battle of Queenston Heights, Upper Canada (October 13, 1812): A major American defeat suffered when Major General Stephen Van Rensselaer attempted to capture Queenston on the west (Canadian) side of the Niagara River, seven miles from its mouth.  Major General Isaac Brock, "the hero of Upper Canada," was killed during the battle.
 Skirmish at Frenchman's Creek, Upper Canada (November 28, 1812): An American raid across the Niagara River intended to prepare the ground for a subsequent invasion of Upper Canada. The objectives were to spike British artillery at Red House to enable the American landing to occur without being subjected to artillery fire, and to destroy a bridge over Frenchman's Creek to prevent the movement of British reinforcements. The first objective was accomplished; the second was not.
 Smyth's failed invasion of Upper Canada (November 28 – December 1, 1812): A debacle for the Americans, caused by poor planning and poor leadership by Brigadier General Alexander Smyth. Immediately following the action at Frenchman's Creek and again on December 1, Smyth tried and failed to get his invasion force assembled and into boats to cross the Niagara River and invade Upper Canada, following which he cancelled the entire operation.

St. Lawrence River

 Occurrence at Carleton Island (June 26, 1812): An unusual incident in which a private American citizen, two other men, and a boy captured a British sergeant and three privates of the  10th Royal Veteran Battalion on Carleton Island, an island in the upper St. Lawrence River about ten miles east of Kingston, Upper Canada, that had been ceded to the United States in 1794. These were the first prisoners taken in the war.
 First attack on Sackets Harbor, New York (July 19, 1812): An unsuccessful British naval attack on Sackets Harbor, a small port at the eastern end of Lake Ontario and the location of an American naval base.
 Battle of the Julia versus the Earl of Moria and the Duke of Gloucester on the St. Lawrence River (July 31, 1812): A standoff between a small American schooner, the Julia, and two larger British ships heading downriver toward Ogdensburg, New York, to attack six American schooners moored there.  After a three-hour exchange of fire off Elizabethtown, New York, the British ships broke off the engagement, and the Julia retired to Ogdensburg.
 Battle of Matilda (Toussaint's Island) (September 16, 1812): A failed attempt by a small force of Americans from Ogdensburg, New York, to intercept a British supply convoy of forty bateaux coming up the St. Lawrence River.
 Raid at Gananoque, Upper Canada (September 21, 1812): A successful raid by American troops from Sackets Harbor on the British depot at Gananoque, about twenty miles from Kingston down the St. Lawrence River.
 First attack on Ogdensburg, New York (October 4, 1812): A failed British amphibious attack on Ogdensburg, a transshipment point for supplies being moved along the St. Lawrence River, repelled by American artillery.
 Skirmishes at Akwesasne and French Mills (October 23 – November 23, 1812): A temporary victory by New York State Militia who captured a British post at Akwesasne, an Indian community that straddled the St. Lawrence River in a location where the present-day borders of Ontario, Quebec and New York State intersect.  It, and the nearby American post at French Mills, were recaptured a month later by a small British force carrying supplies up the St. Lawrence River.
 Skirmish at Lacolle, Lower Canada (November 20, 1812): A battle at Lacolle, a small village on the Lacolle River about five miles north of the New York border. Confused US troops attacked each other, who were then in turn attacked by British/loyalist troops, the US troops, having vast superior numbers, in any case retreated back to Champlain, and Maj. Gen. Henry Dearborn called off his planned invasion of Lower Canada.

American West

 Investment of Fort Madison, Missouri Territory (September 5–12, 1812): An unsuccessful attempt by Sauk and Fox warriors to capture a fort on the upper Mississippi River at the location of present-day Fort Madison, Iowa.

Naval battles

 USS Nautilus versus HMS Shannon (1806) (July 17, 1812): The first capture of an American ship by the British during the war. The American brig Nautilus was pursued and captured by the British frigate Shannon, which was part of a five-ship British squadron that also included HMS Africa, Aeolis, Belvidera, and Guerrière that was cruising off the coast of New Jersey.
 USS Essex versus HMS Alert (1804) (August 13, 1812): A battle off the Azores in which the British sloop Alert surrendered to the American frigate Essex after an engagement lasting only about eight minutes.
 Constitution versus HMS Guerrière (August 19, 1812): The first capture of a British frigate by an American ship. After an engagement of less than three hours about five hundred miles southeast of Newfoundland, the British frigate Guerrière surrendered to the American frigate Constitution.
 Wasp (1807) versus HMS Frolic (1806) (October 18, 1812): An engagement about three hundred miles north of Bermuda that caused serious damage to both ships. The British sloop surrendered only after being boarded by a party from the American sloop. Later in the day, while crews from both ships were making repair, HMS Poictiers captured the Wasp and recaptured the Frolic.
 Wasp (1807) versus HMS Poictiers (1809) (October 18, 1812): The capture of the American sloop Wasp and the recapture of the British sloop Frolic by the British only hours after the Frolic had been captured by the Wasp.
 USS United States vs HMS Macedonian (October 25, 1812): A two-hour-long engagement about five hundred miles west of the Canary Islands, which ended when the British frigate Macedonian surrendered to the American frigate United States, which was on an independent cruise. The Macedonian was towed to New London, Connecticut, and purchased by the U. S. Navy.
 Vixen (1803) versus HMS Southampton (1757) (November 22, 1812): The pursuit and eventual capture of the American brig Vixen, cruising about ninety miles east of St. Augustine, Florida, by the British frigate Southampton. Several days of bad weather prevented the conclusion of the surrender, and both vessels were wrecked on a shoal near Concepcíon Island on November 27.  The crews were rescued and taken to Jamaica.
 Constitution versus HMS Java (1811) (December 29, 1812): A two-and-a-half-hour battle off the coast of Brazil during which the British 38-gun fifth-rate Java suffered such serious damage that its captain ordered it scuttled.

1813

Atlantic Coast

 Warren's Chesapeake Bay Campaign (March–September, 1813): A major naval initiative, commanded by Admiral Sir John Warren, with the goals of blockading Chesapeake Bay, gathering intelligence concerning American strength, destroying the USS Constitution, interrupting commercial traffic within Chesapeake Bay, capturing of American vessels and supplies useful to the British and eventually extending the blockade to include Delaware Bay and Long Island. Although Warren remained the senior commander, many of the operations were conducted by ships under the command of Vice Admiral Sir Alexander Cochrane. Cochrane was much hated by the Americans because of his aggressive actions on-shore, such as destroying the private property of civilians in villages and towns that opposed his landings.
 Battle of the Rappahannock River, Virginia (April 3, 1813): A British foray up the Rappahannock River, which empties into Chesapeake Bay forty miles north of Hampton, Virginia, during which they captured or destroyed fourteen American ships.
 Raid at Frenchtown, Maryland (April 29, 1813): A raid conducted by a British landing party during Sir John Warren's harassing operations in Chesapeake Bay (March–September, 1813) on a small settlement about fifteen miles up the Elk River on the road between Baltimore and Philadelphia.
 Raid on Havre de Grace and Principio Foundry, Maryland (May 3, 1813): A raid conducted by a flotilla of boats under Rear Admiral George Cockburn's command. When Maryland militia resisted the landing at Havre de Grace, the Royal Marines burned and looted homes, burned a warehouse and appropriated or killed livestock. At the Principio Foundry they destroyed a number of guns and the works in which they had been manufactured.
 Raid at Georgetown and Fredericktown, Maryland (May 6, 1813): A raid conducted by a landing party from HMS Mohawk on two villages on the Sassafras River flowing into the northeast corner of Chesapeake Bay. The landing party destroyed uninhabited homes, four schooners and stores of sugar, lumber and leather.
 Assault on Craney Island, Virginia (June 22, 1813): An important victory for the United States fought on an island at the mouth of the Elizabeth River, in which a British landing party failed to overcome a much smaller force of Americans defending the island.  This defensive victory thwarted a British attempt to occupy the port city of Norfolk.
 Capture and occupation of Hampton, Virginia (June 25–26, 1813): The successful British occupation of Hampton, Virginia, following their humiliating failure to secure Craney Island. During the one-day occupation of the town, the British took guns, ammunition, wagons, horses, livestock and other foodstuffs. French troops that were part of the force were reported to have participated in looting, vandalism, raping and killing. British casualties were 5 killed/33 wounded/10 missing.
 Raid at Ocracoke Inlet, North Carolina (July 12–16, 1813): A successful British naval operation in the Ocracoke Inlet, a channel through the Outer Banks off the coast of North Carolina into Pimlico Sound, a route used by American merchantmen during the British blockade of Chesapeake Bay. The raid captured a number of American vessels and confiscated stores and livestock from the villages of Ocracoke and Portsmouth.

American Northwest

 First Battle of Frenchtown, Michigan Territory (January 18, 1813): A skirmish in which an American detachment from Brigadier General William Henry Harrison's winter camp on the Maumee River (near present-day Toledo, Ohio) succeeded in driving a British force consisting of Canadian militia and Potawatomi and Wyandot warriors out of Frenchtown, a village at the mouth of the Raison River about twenty-five miles south of Detroit  (near present-day Monroe, Michigan).
 Second Battle of Frenchtown, Michigan Territory (January 22, 1813): A British victory achieved when a force of regulars, militia and native warriors surprised the Americans in a pre-dawn attack, and after several hours of heavy fighting, accepted the surrender of the entire American command.  The battle came to be known as the Raison River Massacre on account of the massacre the following morning of numerous American wounded waiting to be transported to Fort Malden.  This defeat caused Brigadier General William Henry Harrison to end his winter campaign to recapture Detroit.
 Siege of Fort Meigs, Ohio (May 1–9, 1813): An unsuccessful attempt by a British force consisting of regulars, militia and over a thousand warriors commanded by Tecumseh to capture the recently construct fort at the rapids on the Maumee River about twelve miles from its mouth (near present-day Perrysburg, Ohio).
 Investment of Fort Meigs, Ohio (July 21–28, 1813): A second unsuccessful attempt by the British to capture the fort, this time by a force containing more than three thousand warriors from the Fox, Menominee, Ojibwa, Ottawa, Sac, Sioux and Winnebago Nations under the command of Tecumseh.
 Ball's Battle, Ohio (July 30, 1813): A battle that erupted between a party of Indians loyal to the British and an American force (including Pennsylvania volunteers under the command of Maj. James V. Ball) en route to Fort Stephenson.  The action occurred near Fort Seneca located about eight miles south of Fort Sephenson and thirty-five miles southeast of Fort Meigs.
 Assault on Fort Stephenson, Ohio (August 2, 1813): An unsuccessful attempt by the British to capture Fort Stephenson, a fort on the Sandusky River near present-day Fremont, Ohio.
 Battle of Put-in-Bay, Ohio (September 10, 1813): The pivotal naval battle, also known as the Battle of Lake Erie, in which a squadron under the command of Captain Oliver Hazard Perry defeated the British squadron under Commander Robert Heriot Barclay, giving the United States complete control of Lake Erie.  With their supply line cut, the British in southwestern Lower Canada were forced to abandon Detroit and Fort Amherstburg and retreat eastward toward the Niagara Peninsula.
 Battle of Moraviantown, Upper Canada (October 5, 1813): An American victory at Moraviantown, a village on the Thames River close to the location of present-day Chatham, Ontario, over the British army retreating from Detroit and Fort Amherstburg.  The battle is also referred to as the Battle of the Thames.  Tecumseh and Roundhead, a Wyandot chief and a loyal member of Tecumseh's Confederation, were both killed during this battle.
 Skirmish at McCrea's Farm, Upper Canada (December 15, 1813): A British victory over a small contingent of American troops deployed on the Thames River about twenty-five miles southwest of Moraviantown

Niagara Frontier

 Battle of York, Upper Canada (April 28, 1813): A relatively easy American capture of Fort York and the adjacent town of York (at the location of present-day Toronto), achieved by an amphibious assault of troops from Sackets Harbor. The entire American force withdrew by May 8, but only after vandalizing and looting much of the town and burning the buildings of the provincial legislature. The burning of the Capitol Building during the British raid on Washington was retribution for the American actions in York.
 Battle of Fort George, Upper Canada (May 27, 1813): An American victory in which Fort George, the westernmost British fort on Lake Ontario, located at the mouth of the Niagara River, was captured during an amphibious attack across the river by troops from Fort Niagara on the American side of the river.
 Battle of Stoney Creek, Upper Canada (June 6, 1813): A British victory achieved by a night attack on American troops encamped along Stoney Creek, a creek flowing north into the western end of Lake Ontario about forty miles west of Fort George. The defeat forced the American forces at Fort George to abandon plans to advance further into Upper Canada.
 Second raid at Charlotte, New York, at the mouth of the Genesee River (June 15, 1813): A raid by a landing party from Commodore Sir James Yeo's Squadron that was unopposed and succeeded in confiscating five hundred barrels of flour and a boat containing twelve hundred bushels of corn.
 Battle of Beaver Dams, Upper Canada (June 24, 1813): A successful British ambush by warriors of the Six and Seven Nations, commanded by a British officer, of an American detachment from Fort George on its way to attack a British outpost near Beaver Dams.
 Blockade of Fort George, Upper Canada (July 1 – October 9, 1813): A British attempt to reoccupy Fort George following their victories at Stoney Creek (June 6, 1813) and Beaver Dams (June 24, 1813). There were frequent skirmishes (Ball Property) and raids (Black Rock) during this period. The blockade was lifted in order to redeploy troops in response to developments elsewhere along the Canada–US border, especially Wilkinson's Campaign on the St. Lawrence, which began in October, and the British defeat at Moraviantown in Upper Canada, which occurred on October 5.
 Raid at Fort Schlosser, New York (July 5, 1813): A successful British raid across the Niagara River on Fort Schlosser, during which the raiders seized a field gun, arms and ammunition, a gunboat and two bateaux, food and entrenching tools, and sank a number of additional boats.
 Skirmishes at the Ball Property, Upper Canada (July 8 – September 6, 1813): A series of skirmishes that occurred just west of Niagara, Upper Canada, between the American and British lines during the blockade of Fort George (July 1 – October 9, 1813).
 Raid at Black Rock, New York (July 11, 1813): A British raid on Black Rock, New York, shortly after the British initiated their blockage of Fort George. The initial phase of the raid was very successful, but the British suffered heavy casualties during their withdrawal.
  Raid at York, Upper Canada (July 31 – August 1, 1813): A brief amphibious American incursion in which the Americans freed some prisoners, confiscated military baggage and supplies and a number of bateaux. Before leaving the Americans burned buildings on Gibraltar Point in retribution for the British raid on Sodus, New York, on June 19.
 Loss of the two American schooners Hamilton (1809) and Scourge (1812) (August 8, 1813): The loss, during a violent storm, of the schooners Hamilton and Scourge. The two schooners were part of Commodore Isaac Chauncey's squadron, which was about to go into action against Commodore Sir James Yeo's squadron in Lake Ontario just six miles north of Twelve Mile Creek near the Niagara River.
 Skirmish at Nanticoke Creek, Upper Canada (November 13, 1813): An expedition of Norfolk County militia to capture American loyalist marauders who had been active in the area around Nanticoke Creek, near Lake Erie about sixty miles west of Fort Erie.
 Burning of Niagara, Upper Canada (December 10–11, 1813): The unprovoked burning of Niagara by a small force of American troops under the command of Brigadier General George McClure. McClure felt that his position at Fort George was untenable, and ordered that Niagara be destroyed as he evacuated his command to Fort Niagara.
 Capture of Fort Niagara, New York (December 18–19, 1813): An unexpected night attack by British infantry on the under-strength American garrison at Fort Niagara at the mouth of the Niagara River, which resulted in the relatively easy capture of the fort.  Fort Niagara remained under British control for the rest of the war.
 Raid at Black Rock and Buffalo, New York (December 30, 1813): A British raid launched following the capture of Fort Niagara by the British to retaliate for the burning of the town of Niagara, Upper Canada, by the Americans on December 10–11 and to annihilate all American forces on the Niagara Frontier.  The raid achieved all of its objective, and, for the time being at least, the British were in complete control of the Niagara River region.

St. Lawrence River

 Raid on Brockville (February 7, 1813): A raid conducted on Brockville by American troops garrisoned at Ogdensburg, New York, after a British party from Brockville crossed the St. Lawrence River to enter New York to apprehend deserters.
 Second attack on Ogdensburg, New York (February 22, 1813): A successful British attack culminating in the capture of Ogdensburg, a town from which the Americans could interfere with the movement of supplies by the British along the St. Lawrence River.
 Second attack on Sackets Harbor, New York (May 29, 1813): An unsuccessful British naval and amphibious attack on Sackets Harbor, intended as a diversion while the Americans were bombarding Fort George.
 Capture of the Eagle (1812) and Growler (1812) (June 3, 1813): The capture by the British of two American sloops, Eagle (1812) and Growler (1812), in the Richelieu River on a patrol to prevent smuggling on Lake Champlain.  The British renamed them Shannon (1813) and Broke and pressed them into service on Lake Champlain.
 British raid at Sodus, New York (June 19, 1813): A raid conducted by a landing party from Commodore Sir James Yeo's squadron off Sodus Bay about thirty miles southwest of Oswego, New York.  During the raid the British confiscated supplies.
 Skirmish at Cranberry Creek, New York (July 1 9, 1813): The ambush of a British force advancing up Cranberry Creek to engage an American force that had conducted a successful attack on a British convoy of bateaux carrying supplies up the St. Lawrence River.
 Murray's Raid, New York and Vermont (July 29 – August 4, 1813): A successful British raid on American posts and towns (including Champlain and Plattsburgh) located along the Richelieu River and Lake Champlain.  The British marine force included two former American sloops, the Eagle and Growler, that had been captured in June and renamed Shannon and Broke.  The raid was largely unopposed and resulted in the capture of eight vessels, the destruction of a great deal of public property and the confiscation of useful supplies.  It also asserted British control of Lake Champlain.
 Capture of the American schooners Julia (1812) and Growler (1812) (August 10, 1813): During a battle on Lake Ontario between Commodore Sir James Yeo's and Commodore Isaac Chauncey's squadrons, the two American schooners Julia (1812) and Growler (1812) became separated from the rest of the squadron and were captured by the British. Yeo renamed them Confiance (1813) and Hamilton (1813).
 First Skirmish at Odelltown, Lower Canada (September 20, 1813): A minor skirmish, following which Major General Wade Hampton abandoned his plan to invade Lower Canada along the Richelieu River and retreated to the village of Four Corners on the Upper Chateaguay River in New York.
 Wilkinson's Campaign on the St. Lawrence River (October–November, 1813): Part of a plan for a coordinated attack on Montreal by an American force from Sackets Harbor, under the command of Major General James Wilkinson, down the St. Lawrence River, combined with an attack northward along the Richelieu River from Lake Champlain, by troops commanded by Major General Wade Hampton.  The offensive foundered when Hampton cancelled the advance of his command following the battle of Chateauguay and the defeat of Wilkinson's army at the Battle of Crysler's Farm.
 Raid at Missisquoi Bay, Lower Canada (October 12, 1813): A raid ordered by Major General Wade Hampton on Philipsburg. Lower Canada, located on Missisquoi Bay (the eastern basin in the northern part of Lake Champlain). The goal of the raid was to reduce smuggling between Vermont and Lower Canada and to divert British attention from his efforts to advance along the Richelieu River from Lake Champlain.
 Battle on the Chateauguay, Lower Canada (October 26, 1813): An unsuccessful American attack on Canadien militia and First Nations warriors defending the lower Chateauguay River, following which Major General Wade Hampton announced the end of his campaign to invade Canada along the Richelieu River and retreated to Plattsburgh, New York.
 Skirmish at French Creek, New York (November 1–2, 1813): An inconclusive attempt by the British to disrupt and harass the advance guard of Major General James Wilkinson's army as it advanced from Sackets Harbor down the St. Lawrence River toward Montreal.
 Skirmish at Hoople's Creek, Upper Canada (November 10, 1813): A successful action by the British, which delayed the advance of Major General James Wilkinson's army on Cornwall, Upper Canada, a village at the base of the Long Sault rapids and a landing and storage point for British supplies.
 Battle of Crysler's Farm, Lower Canada (November 11, 1813): The British victory over the rear guard of Major General James Wilkinson's Division near Cornwall, Lower Canada, convinced Wilkinson to abandon his campaign down the St. Lawrence River.

Naval battles

 Viper (1806) versus HMS Narcissus (1801) (January 17, 1813): The pursuit and capture of the American brig Viper, while it was trying to return to New Orleans after it had become separated from its companion ship.  After springing a serious leak, the Viper was captured by the British frigate Narcissus.
 Hornet versus HMS Peacock (1806) (February 24, 1813): An encounter that occurred off the Demerara River, Guyana, when the American sloop Hornet spotted the British sloop Espiegle at anchor in the river while another British warship, the sloop Peacock (1806) was sailing toward him.  The Peacock initiated an engagement and was so badly damaged during the exchange that within half an hour it surrendered and subsequently sank during attempts to rescue the crew.
 Chesapeake (1799) versus HMS Shannon (1806) (June 1, 1813): This battle is noted as the war's only action between frigates of equal strength. The ships exchange broadsides at close range after which Capt. Philip Broke led a British boarding party onto the American ship, which surrendered.  The battle occurred off the New England coast between Cape Cod and Cape Ann.
 Attack on HMS Junon (1810) (June 20, 1813): An attack initiated by a flotilla of American gunboats in the Elizabeth River below Norfolk, Virginia, on the British frigate Junon, which was anchored in shallow water near Hampton Roads.  The captain of the Junan managed to get his ship underway and fought off the Americans for an hour and a half before breaking off the action and withdrawing.
 Delaware flotilla versus HMS Martin (1809) (July 29, 1813): An attack by the Delaware flotilla, consisting of eight gunboats and two blockships, on the British sloop Martin, which ran aground on a shoal near Cape May while engaged in blockade duty off the mouth of the Delaware River.  The Americans broke off the action after about two hours after losing one gunboat.  The Martin sustained only minor damage and was subsequently refloated.
 Argus (1803) versus HMS Pelican (1812) (August 14, 1813): A battle between the British brig Pelican and the American sloop Argus in St. George's Channel between Wales and Ireland.  The Argus had been attacking shipping off the west coast of England.  The encounter caused so much damage to the Argus that it was forced to surrender.
 Enterprise (1799) versus HMS Boxer (1812) (September 5, 1813): An hour-long engagement off the coast of Maine, during which the American brig Enterprise caused such heavy damage on the British sloop Boxer that it was forced to surrender, after which it was towed to Portland. Both commanding officers were killed during the battle, and both were buried with full military honors in Portland.
 President (1800) versus HMS Highflyer (1813) (September 23, 1813): An action off the coast of New England during which the American frigate President captured the British schooner Highflyer.
 Vixen (1813) versus HMS Belvidera (1809) (December 25, 1813): The capture of the American schooner Vixen (1813) off Delaware after a two-hour pursuit by the British frigate Belvidera.  The Vixen (1813) had only recently been purchased by the US Navy, and was on its way to New Castle, Delaware, to be outfitted with guns, equipment and a crew.

Gulf Coast

 Battle of Burnt Corn Creek (July 27, 1813) – An American ambush of a party of the Red Sticks faction of Creek Indians that were returning from purchasing guns and ammo from the British at Pensacola. The initially successful Americans were later dispersed.
 Fort Mims Massacre  (August 30, 1813) – The defeat of the American garrison at Fort Mims by a party of the Red Sticks faction of Creek Indians.
 Battle of Tallushatchee (November 3, 1813) – A successful attack on the Creek village of Tallushatchee with a force of 1000 dragoons commanded by Gen. John Coffee.
 Battle of Talladega (November 9, 1813) – An action led by Andrew Jackson that broke the siege of the friendly Creek Indian town of Talladega, which was being besieged by an enemy Creek force.
 Hillabee Massacre (part 1) (November 11, 1813) – An action in which Gen. White (under Major Gen. John Cocke's command) burned the Hillabee Indian villages of Little Oakfusky and Genalga.
 The Canoe Fight (November 12, 1813) – A skirmish fought along the Alabama River, pitting Capt. Samuel Dale's 70 militia against a larger group of Red Sticks Creeks, fought entirely in canoes.
 Hillabee Massacre (part 2) (November 18, 1813) – An action conducted by troops under the command of Gen. White (under Maj. Gen. John Cocke's command) during which the town of Hillabee was burned.
 Battle of Autossee (November 29, 1813) – An action conducted by Gen. Floyd, with 950 Georgia militia and 400 friendly Indians, attacked the Indian town of Autossee. About two hundred Indians were killed and the town of four hundred houses burned.
 The Action at Nuyaka (December 17, 1813) – An action conducted by troops under the command of Maj. Gen. David Adams in which the upper Creek village of Nuyaka was burned.
 Battle of Holy Ground – also known as the Battle of Econochaca – (December 23, 1813) – An action in which Gen. Claiborne cleared the mostly evacuated Indian town of Econochaca.

1814

Atlantic Coast
 Cochrane's Chesapeake Bay Campaign (April–September, 1814): The extensive campaign waged by the British fleet in the Chesapeake Bay area under the operational command of Rear Admiral George Cockburn, which included, among others, the attacks on Washington and Baltimore.  Cockburn's superior was Vice Admiral Sir Alexander Cochrane, who was in overall command of the Chesapeake Bay Campaign.  Cochrane, who was stridently anti-American, not only encouraged that very aggressive measures be employed by Cockburn in his actions against American settlements along the coast, but also issued a proclamation inviting slaves to join the British and serve in military units or otherwise participate in British military efforts against the Americans.
 Raid on Pettipaug, Connecticut (April 7–8, 1814): A successful British small boat action up the Connecticut River to burn the privateer fleet at Pettipaug (now Essex). Captain Richard Coote led a force of 136 British sailors and marines in six boats up the river, burning 25 American vessels and capturing two, with the loss of only two men. The raid devastated American privateering capabilities.
 Skirmish at Pongoteague Creek, Virginia (May 30, 1814): A successful British amphibious attack on an American battery that had been installed on a bluff at Pongoteague Creek and manned by Virginia militia, in the part of Virginia that extends south from Maryland and separates Chesapeake Bay from the Atlantic Ocean
 Skirmish off of Cedar Point, Maryland (June 1, 1814): An indecisive encounter near the mouth of the Patuxent River between an American flotilla and British ships from Rear Admiral Sir George Cockburn's fleet.  Although both sides maneuvered for advantage and exchanged shots at long range, the Americans broke off action before any damage was done to ships of either side.
 Skirmishes at St. Leonard's Creek, Maryland (June 8–26, 1814): A series of actions initiated by a flotilla of British ships from Rear Admiral Sir George Cockburn's fleet against a flotilla of American ships that had retreated into St. Leonard's Creek, which flows into the Patuxent River about seven miles from its mouth.  While the American flotilla was bottled up in the creek, the British conducted raids along the Patuxent.  The American ships fought their way out of the blockade on June 26.
 Maine Campaign (July, 1814 – April, 1815): A British naval operation along the Maine coast.  The British encountered little opposition, and at various times occupied Eastport, Machias, Castine and Bangor.
Stonington residents resolutely returned fire for three days, resulting in many British casualties but no American casualties.
 Gordon's Raid on the Potomac River (August 17 – September 6, 1814): An expedition up the Potomac River by a squadron of British ships commanded by Captain James Gordon, intended as a diversion from the expedition up the Patuxent River that culminated in the burning of Washington.  Gordon's raid resulted in the expulsion of the American forces at Fort Washington, Maryland, the uncontested occupation of the prosperous port of Alexandria, Virginia, and the capture an abundance of prizes and cargoes.
 Battle of Bladensburg, Maryland (August 24, 1814): The Americans' worst battle of the war during which a British force of less than five thousand troops routed an American force of nearly seven thousand, leaving Washington undefended.
 Burning of Washington, DC (August 24–25, 1814): The occupation of the nation's capital by a British force of four to five thousand troops from Rear Admiral Sir George Cockburn's fleet in Chesapeake Bay, usually interpreted as retaliation for the American burning and looting of York in 1813.  The British burned the Capitol Building, the Library of Congress, the White House and buildings housing the Treasury and War Departments, but the only private building set afire was one from which the British had been fired upon.
 Attack on Baltimore, Maryland (September 12–15, 1814): A combined sea and land assault on the important port city of Baltimore.  The Americans repulsed both the bombardment of Fort McHenry and the land invasion.
 Battle of North Point, Maryland (September 12, 1814): An important battle that thwarted the British plan to follow up their victories at Bladensburg and Washington with the capture of Baltimore.  The British landing party, under the command of Maj. Gen. Robert Ross met the American force, under the command of Brig. Gen. John Stricker, at the narrowest point of the peninsula leading from North Point to Baltimore.  Although the Americans eventually were forced to retreat, they were able to do so in good order having inflicted significant casualties on the British, killing Gen. Ross and significantly demoralizing the troops under his command. This combination prompted Col. Arthur Brooke, now in command following Ross's death, to delay the advance against Baltimore, buying valuable time to properly prepare for the defense of the city as Gen. Stricker retreated back to the main defenses to bolster the existing force.
 Bombardment of Fort McHenry, Maryland (September 13–14, 1814): The failed British attempt during the attack on Baltimore to subdue Fort McHenry, which blocked access to Baltimore Harbor.  When it became evident that Fort McHenry would not surrender, the major British land assault was called off, and the troops that had landed at North Point were withdrawn.

American Northwest

 Skirmish at Longwoods, Upper Canada (March 4, 1814): An American victory that occurred when a mounted raiding party from Detroit was intercepted by a British force from an outpost at Delaware, Upper Canada, about halfway between Amherstburg on the Detroit River and Burlington at the western end of Lake Ontario.
 Sinclair's Campaign on the Upper Lakes (July–August, 1814): A largely unsuccessful attempt by the Americans to seize control of the upper lakes following the withdrawal of British forces from the area around Detroit.  The only American successes were to capture three British merchantmen, destroy an abandoned British fort on St. Joseph's Island and conduct a raid on the trading post on the St. Mary River.  They failed to recapture Fort Michillimackinaw, and lost two schooners on the return trip.
 Raid at St. Mary River, Upper Canada (July 23–26, 1814): A raid conducted by elements of Captain Arthur Sinclair's squadron on the St. Mary River, which connects Lake Superior to Lake Huron.  The Americans captured a fur-trading post, destroyed buildings and captured the British schooner Perseverance at the head of the rapids.  The schooner was badly damaged while attempting to run the rapids, and was then set afire.
 Assault on Mackinac Island (August 4, 1814): A failed attempt by the Americans to recapture Mackinac Island during Captain Arthur Sinclair's Campaign on the Upper Lakes.
Destruction of HMS Nancy (August 13, 1814): The destruction of the British schooner Nancy in the Nottawasaga River two miles from its mouth on Georgian Bay by an American landing party, which included two howitzers, from Captain Arthur Sinclair's squadron.
 Capture of the American schooners Tigress and Scorpion (September 3 and 6, 1814): A daring operation in which a small detachment of the Royal Newfoundland Fencibles and a few seamen captured the Tigress and Scorpion near Drummond Island.  The Tigress was approached and boarded by a party from canoes and bateaux; the Scorpion was taken a few days later by a boarding party from the Tigress.
 McArthur's Raid/Battle of Malcolm's Mills (November 6, 1814): An American victory in the upper Thames Valley between Canadian militia and an American force of 750 mounted infantry, led by Brig. Gen. Duncan McArthur.  During a two-week incursion into Canada, McArthur's Raid destroyed the mills that the British forces in the Northwest were dependent upon for flour and bread and created a diversion that allowed the American forces at Fort Erie to escape unharmed. Additionally the American's killed, wounded or captured over 450 of their enemy, accomplished with the loss of only one killed and six wounded.

Niagara Frontier

 Raid on Port Dover, Upper Canada (May 14–15, 1814): An American raid on settlements on the north shore of Lake Erie where there were mills and storehouses containing supplies used by British troops stationed in the Niagara Peninsula.  Before withdrawing the American troops set fire to mills, storehouses and private dwellings in retribution for the British raid at Black Rock and Buffalo in December, 1813.
 Brown's Campaign on the Niagara River (July–October, 1814): The most competently planned and executed attempt by the Americans to invade Canada along the Niagara Frontier.  It began with victories at Fort Erie and Chippewa, stalled at the well-fought draw at Lundy's Lane, and ended when the Americans retired to Fort Erie.
 Capture of Fort Erie, Upper Canada (July 3, 1814): The opening battle of Major General Jacob Brown's Campaign on the Niagara River.  The British surrendered the fort, which is located at the confluence of Lake Erie and the Niagara River on Canadian side, without much of a fight.
 Battle of Chippawa, Upper Canada (July 5, 1814): A well-fought American victory against a numerically superior British force that took place just south of Chippawa Creek, not far from where it flows into the Niagara River.
 Burning of St. Davids, Upper Canada (July 18, 1814): An action taken by a battalion of New York militia that encountered unexpectedly fierce resistance from residents of a village close to Queenston Heights, where Major General Jacob Brown wanted to occupy a position following the Battle of Chippawa.  Brown dismissed the American commander who ordered the action.
 Battle of Lundy's Lane, Upper Canada (July 25, 1814): The bloodiest battle of the war, which took place near Niagara Falls just north of the site of the Battle of Chippawa.  Although the battle was a draw, it was so costly to the Americans that their army had to fall back to Fort Erie, thus marking the end of Brown's invasion of Upper Canada.
 Skirmish at Conjocta Creek, New York (August 3, 1814): An action undertaken by the British following the Battle of Lundy's Lane with the objective of destroying American supplies and batteries at Black Rock and Buffalo.  The plan unraveled when the British force was defeated at Conjocta Creek, which was between them and Black Rock.
 Siege of Fort Erie, Upper Canada (August 5 – September 21, 1814): The unsuccessful British attempt to recapture Fort Erie, involving nearly continuous skirmishing and a failed assault on August 15.
 Capture of the American schooners Ohio and Somers (August 12, 1814): The capture by a party of British naval officers and seamen from ships blockaded at Niagara of two American schooners that had been bombarding a British battery north of Fort Erie.
 Destruction of the British brig Magnet (August 15, 1814): An incident in which Lieutenant George Hawkesworth deliberately ran his ship, the British brig Magnet, aground not far from the mouth of the Niagara River rather than allowing it to be captured by Commodore Isaac Chaucey's squadron from Sackets Harbor.  To avoid court-martial Hawkesworth deserted to the Americans.
 Assault on Fort Erie, Upper Canada (August 15, 1814): An unsuccessful British attempt to recapture Fort Erie from the Americans.  The British plan was a complicated one, involving an initial bombardment followed by a diversionary attack by a force of native warriors and a coordinated night attack from the south, west and north, against a larger-than-expected and well-led American force on the inside.
 Sortie from Fort Erie, Upper Canada (September 17, 1814): A sortie against British batteries still bombarding the fort after the failed British assault.  The action was a costly one for both sides.  Shortly thereafter the British lifted their siege and retreated to positions at Chippawa.
 Skirmish at Cook's Mills, Upper Canada (October 19, 1814): The final engagement of the war on the Niagara Peninsula, also known as the Skirmish at Lyons Creek.  The action began as an American attempt to seize and destroy British provisions at Cook's Mills following the lifting of the British siege at Fort Erie.  It enjoyed a limited success, resulting in the destruction of two hundred bushels of grain.

St. Lawrence River
 Raids on the Salmon River, New York (February 14–24, 1814): A series of British raids on American depots and supply centers left unprotected following the evacuation of French Mills by Maj. Gen. James Wilkinson's army in early February.  The British captured large quantities of provisions and equipment from depots at French Mills, Malone, Fort Corners, Madrid and Hopkinton before returning to Canada.
 Second Battle of Lacolle, Lower Canada (March 30, 1814): A British victory that ended the last American attempt to invade Lower Canada along the Richelieu River.
 Assault on Oswego, New York (May 5–6, 1814): A successful British amphibious attack on Oswego, New York, an important American transshipment point for supplies, especially heavy ordnance and equipment, between inland New York and Lake Ontario.  During this raid, the British also captured Fort Ontario, which was only lightly defended.
 Skirmish at Otter Creek, Vermont (May 14, 1814): An American victory by a naval squadron, commanded by Master Commandant Thomas MacDononough, supported by a battery at Fort Cassin, over a British naval force sailing from Isle-aux-Noix, Lower Canada, attempting to attack the shipyard at Vergennes, Vermont.
 Skirmish on Sandy Creek, New York (May 30, 1814): An ambush of seven British ships, several loaded with troops, patrolling along the south shore of Lake Ontario between Oswego and Sackets Harbor, by an American force that tricked the British into following an American boat up the river before launching an attack from the banks.
 Second Skirmish at Odelltown, Lower Canada (June 28, 1814): One of a series of indecisive skirmishes occurring on the border between New York and Lower Canada during the spring and summer of 1814.
 Prévost's Lake Champlain Campaign (August 30 – September 12, 1814): An unsuccessful invasion of the United States along the Richelieu River and Lake Champlain by a British army reinforced by regulars transferred to North America following Napoleon's abdication.  The American victory had a significant impact on the negotiations at Ghent to end the war, allowing the Americans to insist upon exclusive rights to Lake Champlain and to deny the British exclusive rights to the Great Lakes.
 Battle of Plattsburgh, New York (September 11, 1814): The American victory that brought an end to the British invasion of New York, during which Captain George Downie's squadron, supported by three of Sir George Prevost's divisions, was defeated on Lake Champlain, New York, by Master Commodore Thomas MacDonough's squadron, supported by Brigadier General Alexander Macomb's land forces.

Gulf Coast

 Battles of Emuckfaw and Enotachopo Creek (Jan 22, 1814)
 Battle of Calebee Creek – also called Battle for Camp Defiance – (Jan 27, 1814)
 Battle of Horseshoe Bend (1814) (Mar 27, 1814)
 Cochrane's Gulf Coast Campaign (May, 1814 – February, 1815).  The naval operation off the southern coast of the United States that supported British efforts to fashion an alliance with the Creek Nation against the Americans and later to support the British attacks on Mobile and New Orleans.
 Attack on Fort Bowyer, Spanish West Florida (September 15, 1814): An unsuccessful attempt by two British sloops and a detachment of Royal Marines from Pensacola to capture Fort Bowyer, a fort on the tip of a peninsula near the mouth of Mobile Bay.
 Capture of Pensacola, Spanish Florida (November 7, 1814): A successful American operation, led by Major General Andrew Jackson, to remove the threat to Mobile from British troops based at Spanish-held Pensacola.
 Battle of Lake Borgne, Louisiana (December 14, 1814): A battle on Lake Borgne, a lake situated just east of New Orleans, between a flotilla of American ships and British ships from Vice Admiral Sir Alexander Cochrane's fleet.  The British eventually prevailed in a hard-fought battle, thereby enabling a landing close to the city of New Orleans.
 Battle at the Villeré Plantation, Louisiana (December 23, 1814): The opening engagement of the Battle of New Orleans, precipitated by a surprise attack by the Americans on the advance force of British camped on Major General Jacque Villeré's plantation on the east bank of the Mississippi River about seven miles below New Orleans.
 Reconnaissance in force by British at New Orleans, Louisiana (December 28, 1814): A probe by the British of Major General Andrew Jackson's main defense line on the Rodriguez Canal about four miles below New Orleans.

American West

 Occupation of Prairie du Chien, Illinois Territory (June 2, 1814): A preemptive move by the Americans to occupy a fur-trading settlement at the confluence of the Wisconsin and Mississippi Rivers on the waterway connecting The Great Lakes and the Mississippi River watershed, which might be useful for the British as a base for a possible invasion down the Mississippi.  The Americans constructed Fort Shelby following their occupation of the town.
 Siege of Fort Shelby, Illinois Territory (July 17–20, 1814): The successful capture of the fort by the British, undertaken to prevent the Americans from interrupting the lucrative fur trade that passed through Prairie du Chien.
 First skirmish at Rock Island Rapids, Missouri Territory (July 21, 1814): An attack by a band of Sauk warriors allied with the British, which forced an American party of five boats carrying supplies up the Mississippi River to Fort Shelby to retreat back down the river.  The engagements at Rock Island Rapids were the westernmost actions in the War of 1812.
 Second skirmish at Rock Island Rapids, Missouri Territory (September 5, 1814): A failed American expedition sent up the Mississippi River to destroy villages and crops of the Sauk and Fox Nations at Saukenuk, in what is presently northwestern Illinois.  The expedition was attacked by over a thousand warriors and forced to retreat downstream.

Naval battles

 Constitution versus HMS Pictou (1813) (February 14, 1814):  The capture and scuttling of the British schooner Pictou by the American frigate Constitution between Barbados and Surinam.
 Essex versus HMS Phoebe and HMS Cherub (March 28, 1814): The capture of the American frigate Essex by the British frigate Phoebe and sloop Cherub as it tried to escape from the neutral harbor of Valparaiso.
 Frolic (1813) versus HMS Orpheus (1809) and HMS Shelburne (1813) (April 20, 1814): The capture of the American sloop Frolic off the coast of Cuba by the British frigate Orpheus and sloop Shelburne after a six-hour pursuit.  The British renamed the Frolic the Florida and pressed it into service.
 Peacock (1813) versus HMS Epervier (April 29, 1814) : A 45-minute battle off Cape Canaveral, Florida in which the American sloop Peacock captured the British brig-sloop Epervier.
 Rattlesnake (1813) versus HMS Leander (1813) (June 22, 1814): The capture of the American brig Rattlesnake by the British 50-gun fourth-rate Leander near Sable Island off Nova Scotia.  In an attempt to escape pursuit by the Leander, the Rattlesnake jettisoned its last two guns, its other guns having been jettisoned earlier in an attempt to escape a British frigate that was pursuing it.
 Wasp (1813) versus HMS Reindeer (June 28, 1814): A battle in the mouth of the English Channel which resulted in the capture and destruction of the British sloop Reindeer by the American sloop Wasp.
 Siren versus HMS Medway (1812) (July 12, 1814): The capture of the American brig-sloop Siren by the British 74-gun third-rate Medway off the coast of South Africa after an 11-hour pursuit.
 Wasp (1814) versus HMS Avon (September 1, 1814): A battle off the coast of England in which the American sloop Wasp defeated the British sloop Avon, but was prevented from taking the ship as prize by the arrival of other British warships. However, the Avon sank before it could be secured by the British reinforcements.

1815

Gulf Coast
 Cumberland Island Campaign (January–March, 1815): A diversionary expedition of Cochrane's Gulf Coast Campaign (May, 1814 – February, 1815) to the southeastern coast of the United States undertaken with the possible intent of linking up with the British army attacking New Orleans.  The British force, commanded by Rear Admiral George Cockburn, occupied Cumberland Island located in the mouth of the St. Marys River between Georgia and Florida, captured the fort on the south bank of the river, and occupied the town of St. Marys in January.  A plan to attack Savannah, Georgia, and Charleston, South Carolina, did not materialize, although the British effectively blockaded the two cities and other stretches of the southern coast. Cockburn was not informed of the Treaty of Ghent, signed on December 24, 1814, until February 27, 1815, and departed the island on March 18.
 Artillery duel at New Orleans, Louisiana (January 1, 1815): A three-hour exchange of cannon fire between four British batteries, including heavy naval guns and a rocket battery, and seven American batteries in Major General Andrew Jackson's line of defense. The British ended the exchange when their artillery ran out of ammunition and failed to breach Jackson's ramparts.
 Final assault at New Orleans, Louisiana (January 8, 1815): This battle was the most lop-sided American victory of the war. While the British suffered 2549 casualties (killed, wounded and captured), the Americans suffered around 333. This battle helped drive Andrew Jackson's career forwards and gave him greater fame.
 Bombardment of Fort St. Philip, Louisiana (January 9–18, 1815): An unsuccessful attempt by the British to dislodge the American forces at Fort St. Philip, a fort about thirty miles from the mouth of the Mississippi River that would have blocked efforts to supply the British in New Orleans.
 Capture of Fort Bowyer, Spanish West Florida (February 12, 1815): The last engagement of the war along the Gulf Coast. During their retreat from New Orleans, the British first landed on Dauphine Island near Mobile Bay, then recaptured the nearby Fort Bowyer, only to withdraw soon after receiving news of the signing of the Treaty of Ghent, which declared an end to the hostilities.

American West
 Battle of the Sink Hole, Missouri Territory (May 24, 1815): The last land battle of the War of 1812, an engagement between Missouri Rangers and Sauk warriors led by Black Hawk, near the mouth of the Cuivre River a few miles upriver from St. Louis.

Naval battles
 President (1800) versus HMS Endymion (1797) (January 15, 1815): The capture of the American frigate President in an attempt to break out of the British blockade of New York City. It surrendered after being severely damaged in an engagement with HMS Endymion.
 Constitution versus HMS Cyane and HMS Levant (February 20, 1815): The capture of the two British sixth-rates Cyane and Levant by the American frigate Constitution about two hundred miles northeast of Madeira. The Levant was later recaptured by the British frigate Leander.
 US privateer Chasseur versus HMS St Lawrence (1813) (February 26, 1815): The capture of the British schooner St. Lawrence which was carrying news of the signing of the Treaty of Ghent to British in the Gulf of Mexico, by the American privateer Chasseur.
 Pursuit and recapture of HMS Levant (1813) (March 11, 1815): The recapture by a British squadron under the command of Captain Sir George Collier of the British warship Levant, which had been captured, along with the Cyane, by the USS Constitution a few weeks earlier. The Levant was recaptured as the Constitution tried to flee with its two prizes from the harbor at Porto Playa in the Cape Verde Islands.
 USS Hornet versus HMS Penguin (March 23, 1815): The capture of the British sloop Penguin by the American sloop Hornet in a battle near Tristan de Cunha.
Peacock versus East India Company ship Nautilus (June 30, 1815): The final naval engagement of the war, in which the American sloop Peacock fired on and seriously damaged the East India brig Nautilus in the Straits of Sunda off Java. The British captain, Lieutenant Charles Boyce informed the commander of the American ship that the Treaty of Ghent ending the war had been signed on December 24, 1814, but the Americans opened fire anyway.

See also
 Timeline of the War of 1812

Notes

References

Bibliography
Mahon, John K. The War of 1812. Gainesville, FL: University of Florida Press, 1972. .
Malcomson, Robert.  Historical Dictionary of the War of 1812.  Lanham, MD: The Scarecrow Press, 2006.  .

War of 1812
War of 1812